Events in the year 1865 in Belgium.

Incumbents

Monarch: Leopold I (until 10 December); Leopold II (from in 17 December)
Head of government: Charles Rogier

Events
March
 16 March – Belgian state guarantees private savings.

April
 4 April – Opposition parties accuse government of breaching Belgian neutrality by involving the country in the Second French intervention in Mexico.

May
 1 May – Henricus Franciscus Bracq consecrated as bishop of Ghent
 22 May — Commercial treaty with the German Customs Union signed in Berlin.
 26 May – 1863–75 cholera pandemic caused 45,000 fatalities in Belgium in 1865.

July
 16 July – Belgian Legion wins Battle of la Loma in Mexico.

August
 21 August — Law on tariffs and customs reform published.

September
 23 September – Brussels city council approves plans for the covering of the Senne.

October
 2 October – Sint-Lievenscollege founded in Ghent

November
 2 November – Treaty of Amity, Commerce and Navigation between China and Belgium, negotiated by Auguste t'Kint, signed in Beijing.
 14 November – Jules Bara succeeds Victor Tesch as Minister of Justice.

December
 10 December – Death of Leopold I of Belgium.
 16 December – Leopold I of Belgium buried in Laken, despite his wish to be buried in Windsor; Auguste t'Kint arrives in Yokohama as the first Belgian diplomat in Japan.
 17 December – Leopold II of Belgium sworn in as head of state.
 23 December — Convention between France, Belgium, Italy and Switzerland forming the Latin Monetary Union signed in Paris.

Publications
Periodicals
Almanach royal officiel (Brussels, H. Tarlier and Rozez)
Analectes pour servir à l'histoire ecclésiastique de la Belgique, vol. 2, edited by P. F. X. de Ram.
Annales de la Société d'émulation pour l'étude de l'histoire et des antiquités de la Flandre, 2nd series, vol. 13 (Bruges, Vandecasteele-Werbrouck)
 Annuaire de l'Université catholique de Louvain, vol. 29 (Leuven, Vanlinthout)
 Collection de précis historiques, vol. 14, edited by Edouard Terwecoren S.J.
 La Liberté begins publication (March).
 Revue Générale begins publication (January).
 Rond den Heerd begins publication (December).

Scholarship
 Émile de Borchgrave, Histoire des colonies belges, qui s'établirent en Allemagne pendant le XIIe et le XIIIe siècle (Brussels)
 Joseph Jean De Smet (ed.), Recueil des chroniques de Flandre, vol. 4 (Brussels, Commission royale d'Histoire)
Joseph Jean De Smet, Mémoire historique sur la guerre de Maximilien, roi des Romains, contre les villes de Flandre (1482-1488) (Brussels, Hayez for Royal Academy of Science, Letters and Fine Arts of Belgium) – a study of the Flemish revolts against Maximilian of Austria.
 Paul Henrard, Histoire de l'artillerie en Belgique depuis son origine jusqu'au règne d'Albert et d'Isabelle (Brussels, C. Muquardt)
 Alphonse O'Kelly de Galway, Dictionnaire des cris d'armes et devises des personnages célèbres et des familles nobles et autres de la Belgique ancienne et moderne (Brussels, A. Schnée)

Literature
 Hendrik Conscience, De Burgemeester van Luik

Art and architecture

Buildings
 Arlon Synagogue completed.

Paintings
 Henri Leys, Lucie Leys

Science
 Louis Melsens receives Montyon Prize for his work on the use of potassium iodide to treat mercury poisoning and lead poisoning.

Balance of trade
In 1865 imports to Belgium were valued at 1.364 million francs, with exports of 1.204 million francs.

Births
 Date uncertain – Joseph Middeleer, painter (died 1939)
 19 January – Égide Rombaux, sculptor (died 1942)
 27 January – Ferdinand Feyerick, fencer (died 1920)
 30 January – Marie de Bièvre, painter (died 1909)
 25 February – Flavie Van den Hende, cellist (died 1925)
 2 March – Théo Ysaÿe, composer (died 1918)
 7 March – Jean Massart, botanist (died 1925)
 2 April – Louise Danse, painter (died 1948)
 4 April – Clément Van Bogaert, engineer (died 1937)
 1 May – Frans Mortelmans, painter (died 1936)
 4 May – Servais Le Roy, entertainer (died 1953)
 9 May – August de Boeck, composer (died 1937)
 21 May – Evert Larock, painter (died 1901)
 6 June – Antoon Jozef Witteryck, publisher (died 1934)
 15 June – Paul Gilson, composer (died 1942)
 14 July – Marguerite Verboeckhoven, painter (died 1949)

Deaths
 3 January – Joseph Lies, painter (born 1821)
 5 January – Pierre Kersten, publisher (born 1789)
 14 January – Marie-Anne Libert, botanist (born 1782)
 19 March – Joseph Lebeau, politician (born 1794)
 26 April – Charles-Joseph Sax musical instrument maker (born 1790)
 14 May – Pierre François Xavier de Ram, historian (born 1804)
 18 June – Antoine Wiertz, painter (born 1806)
 12 July – Constant de Kerchove de Denterghem, politician (born 1790)
 23 July – Frans Alfons Janssens, priest-scientist (died 1924)

References

 
Belgium
Years of the 19th century in Belgium
1860s in Belgium
Belgium